The following elections occurred in the year 1923.

Asia
 China presidential election
 Hong Kong sanitary board election
 Persian legislative election
 India 
 Madras Presidency legislative council election
 general election 
 Palestinian Legislative Council election
 Turkish general election

Africa
 Egyptian parliamentary election
 Liberian general election
 Nigerian general election

Europe
 Estonia: 
 1923 Estonian parliamentary election
 Estonian religious education referendum
 1923 Greek legislative election
 1923 Irish general election
 1923 Kingdom of Serbs, Croats and Slovenes parliamentary election
 Latvian church property referendum
 Switzerland: Referendums

United Kingdom
 1923 Berwick-upon-Tweed by-election
 1923 Darlington by-election
 1923 United Kingdom general election
 List of MPs elected in the 1923 United Kingdom general election
 1923 Morpeth by-election
 1923 Tiverton by-election
 1923 Willesden East by-election

North America

Canada
 1923 Alberta prohibition plebiscite
 1923 Edmonton municipal election
 1923 Newfoundland general election
 1923 Ontario general election
 1923 Prince Edward Island general election
 1923 Quebec general election
 1923 Toronto municipal election

United States
 1923 New York state election

Central and South America
 Costa Rican general election
 Guatemalan parliamentary election
 Honduran general election
 Salvadoran presidential election
 Bolivian legislative election

Oceania

Australia
 Rockhampton state by-election
 1923 Queensland state election

New Zealand
 New Zealand Labour Party leadership election
 1923 Oamaru by-election
 1923 Tauranga by-election
 Wellington City mayoral election

See also
 :Category:1923 elections

1923
Elections